The 2021 Northwestern State Lady Demons softball team represented Northwestern State University during the 2021 NCAA Division I softball season. The Lady Demons played their home games at Lady Demon Diamond and were led by thirteenth year head coach Donald Pickett. They were members of the Southland Conference.

Preseason

Southland Conference Coaches Poll
The Southland Conference Coaches Poll was released on February 5, 2021. Northwestern State was picked to finish sixth in the Southland Conference with 156 votes and 1 first place vote.

Preseason All-Southland team

First Team
Kaylyn Shephard (UCA, R-SR, 1st Base)
Cayla Joens (NSU, JR, 2nd Base)
Cylla Hall (UCA, R-SR, 3rd Base)
Cori McCrary (MCNS, SR, Shortstop)
Ella Manzer (SELA, SR, Catcher)
Samantha Bradley (ACU, R-SR, Designated Player)
Linsey Tomlinson (ACU, R-SR, Outfielder)
Kaylee Lopez (MCNS, SO, Outfielder)
Elise Vincent (NSU, SR, Outfielder)
Madisen Blackford (SELA, SR, Outfielder)
Megan McDonald (SHSU, SR, Outfielder)
Kayla Beaver (UCA, R-FR, Pitcher)
Kassidy Wilbur (SFA, JR, Pitcher)
E. C. Delafield (NSU, JR, Utility)

Second Team
Shaylon Govan (SFA, SO, 1st Base)
Brooke Malia (SHSU, SR, 2nd Base)
Bryana Novegil (SFA, SR, 2nd Base)
Caitlin Garcia (NICH, JR, 3rd Base)
Alex Hudspeth (SFA, JR, Shortstop)
Alexis Perry (NSU, SO, Catcher)
Bailey Richards (SFA, SR, Catcher)
Caitlyn Brockway (HBU, SO, Designated Player)
Reagan Sperling (UCA, R-JR, Outfielder)
Alayis Seneca (MCNS, SO, Outfielder)
Hayley Barbazon (NSU, SR, Outfielder)
Saleen Flores (MCNS, SO, Pitcher)
MC Comeaux (SELA, FR, Pitcher)
Sammi Thomas (TAMUCC, SO, Utility)

National Softball Signing Day

Roster

Coaching staff

Schedule and results

Schedule Source:*Rankings are based on the team's current ranking in the NFCA/USA Softball poll.

Posteason

Conference Accolades 
Player of the Year: Kassidy Wilbur – SFA
Hitter of the Year: Shaylon Govan – SFA
Pitcher of the Year: Kassidy Wilbur – SFA
Freshman of the Year: Jenna Wildeman – UCA
Newcomer of the Year: Jenna Edwards – MCNS
Coach of the Year: Nicole Dickson – SFA

All Conference First Team
Shaylon Govan (SFA)
Bryana Novegil (SFA)
Haylee Brinlee (MCNS)
Cori McCrary (MCNS)
Heidi Jaquez (HBU)
E. C. Delafield (NSU)
Mackenzie Bennett (SFA)
Jenna Wildeman (UCA)
Megan McDonald (SHSU)
Aeriyl Mass (SELA)
Kayla Beaver (UCA)
Kassidy Wilbur (SFA)

All Conference Second Team
Kaylyn Shephard (UCA)
Mary Kate Brown (UCA)
Lindsey Rizzo (SELA)
Camryn Middlebrook (SFA)
Hannah Scheaffer (SHSU)
Gaby Garcia (SFA)
Kaylee Lopez (MCNS)
Donelle Johnson (ACU)
Jil Poullard (MCNS)
Audrey Greely (SELA)
Jordan Johnson (UCA)
Whitney Tate (MCNS)

All Conference Third Team
Caitlyn Brockway (HBU)
Cayla Jones (NSU)
Alex Hedspeth (SFA)
Ashlyn Reavis (NICH)
Chloe Gomez (MCNS)
Jasie Roberts (HBU)
Anna Rodenberg (SELA)
Kaitlyn St. Clair (NSU)
Sheridan Fisher (SHSU)
Pal Egan (TAMUCC)
Lyndie Swanson (HBU)
Heather Zumo (SELA)

References:

References

Northwestern State
Northwestern State Lady Demons softball seasons
Northwestern State Lady Demons softball